The Cape Town Philharmonic Orchestra (CPO) is an orchestra based in Cape Town, Western Cape, South Africa.

History 

Founded by the Cape Town City Council, the Cape Town Municipal Orchestra held its inaugural concert on 28 February 1914 in the Cape Town City Hall. This orchestra and its predecessors soon established a reputation both nationally and internationally, with concerts and tours throughout South Africa, the UK, Taiwan, the Canary Islands and the United States.

Apart from regular symphony concerts, the Cape Town Philharmonic Orchestra (as it is known today), regularly accompanies Cape Town Opera; Cape Town City Ballet; musicals; pop, community, family and crossover concerts, presenting 120 concerts per annum or more.

Traditional venues such as the Cape Town City Hall, Artscape Opera, community and schools halls, and such outdoor venues as Kirstenbosch, Oude Libertas Amphitheatre, and Nederburg Wines, all point to the orchestra's community involvement.

Educational programs 

The Cape Town Philharmonic Orchestra's outreach and educational programs include the Cape Town Philharmonic Youth Orchestra (mentored by members of the professional orchestra); Cape Town Philharmonic Youth Wind Ensemble; and the grassroots training project, Masidlale (meaning "let us play" in Xhosa), where disadvantaged township children are taught theory and performance skills.

Centenary celebrations 

To mark its centenary celebrations in 2014, the Cape Town Philharmonic Orchestra published A Century of Symphony: The Story of Cape Town's Orchestra to record the history and heritage of symphonic music in Cape Town and beyond. International and local musicians/conductors who performed/conducted the orchestra as referred to in the book are, among others, Jascha Heifetz, Noël Coward, Sir Thomas Beecham, Igor Stravinsky, Vladimir Ashkenazy, and Pretty Yende.

Recordings 

Significant recordings released by the Cape Town Philharmonic Orchestra include Mahler and Wagner songs with mezzo-soprano Hanneli Rupert (Bernhard Gueller, conductor); the Schnittke oratorio Nagasaki, and Symphonies No. 0 and No. 9, a double CD of orchestral masterpieces (Owain Arwel Hughes, conductor); the Barber and Korngold violin concerti with Alexander Gilman as soloist (Perry So, conductor) which won a Diapason d'Or, and the four Spohr clarinet concerti with clarinetist Maria du Toit (conductor). Marking his 50th birthday, the South African pianist, François du Toit performed all Beethoven piano concerti in 2016 (Victor Yampolsky, conductor).

Principal guest conductor 

Previously music director of the Nuremberg Symphony Orchestra; principal conductor of the Victoria Symphony in BC, Canada, and presently director of Symphony Nova Scotia since 2003, German-born conductor Bernhard Gueller was appointed principal guest conductor of the Cape Town Philharmonic Orchestra in 2016, following Owain Arwel Hughes and Martin Panteleev.

Resident conductor 

Winner of the first Len van Zyl Conductors' Competition, Brandon Phillips, is conductor of the Cape Town Philharmonic Youth Orchestra, and resident conductor of the Cape Town Philharmonic Orchestra.

References

External links
 

Cape Town culture
Musical groups established in 1914
South African orchestras
Musical groups from Cape Town